Twistaplot is a series of children's gamebooks that were published by Scholastic from 1982 to 1985. Books #1, #4, #9, and #14 were written by R.L. Stine, who would go on to write the Fear Street series and the Goosebumps series, which in turn spawned the gamebook spin-off series Give Yourself Goosebumps. The remaining books were written by various authors including Louise Munro Foley. They were Scholastic's response to the Choose Your Own Adventure series. After the success of the Goosebumps series, the Twistaplot titles that were written by R. L. Stine were reissued with new covers in 1994 and 1995.

Style and gameplay
Twistaplot covers a wide variety of genres, including science fiction, fantasy, and horror. Similar to the Give Yourself Goosebumps series, they are novels with branching plots. The books are written from the second-person perspective, in present-tense form. The protagonist in each book is never referred to by name, and the protagonist's gender is usually ambiguous. Thus readers can easily imagine themselves as the protagonist of the story. Unlike the Give Yourself Goosebumps series, the books have interior illustrations.

Spin-offs
After the success of Twistaplot, the series spawned a series of computer games for Scholastic's electronic magazine, Microzine. It also spawned another gamebook spin-off titled Pick-a-Path, which was intended for a younger audience.

Books

Twistaplot
The Time Raider
The Train of Terror
The Formula for Trouble
Golden Sword of Dragonwalk
The Sinister Studios of KESP-TV
Crash Landing!
The Video Avenger
Race into the Past
Horrors of the Haunted Museum
Mission of the Secret Spy Squad
Camp-Out on Danger Mountain
Journey to Vernico 5
Midnight at Monster Mansion
Instant Millionaire
Spellcaster
Secrets of the Lost Island
Ghost Riders of Goldspur
Calling Outer Space

Pick-a-Path
The Dandee Diamond Mystery
The Roller Coaster Ghost
The Great Baseball Championship
The Amazing Bubblegum Caper
The Super Trail Bike Race
Mystery at Mockingbird Manor
The Fantastic Journey of the Space Shuttle Astra
The Magic Top Mystery
Jungle Adventure
The Mystery of the Missing Mummy
Dinosaur Adventure
The Ballerina Mystery
The Secret of 13
RIM, The Rebel Robot
The Hot Dog Gang Caper
Adventure at Camp Schoonover
Murf the Monster

External links
Twistaplot at Gamebooks.org

Gamebooks
Series of children's books
Scholastic Corporation books